Mary A. Bell (1873–1941) was an African-American artist and illustrator. She produced over 150 known works featuring mostly women of all classes and races in their daily lives. She was little known during her life, but became more prominent after a showcase of her art at Yale University in the 1980s.

Early life 
Bell was born on July 2, 1873 in Washington, D.C., to James F. Bell and Susanna County.

Bell received no formal training in illustration, instead working various domestic jobs until her 60s. In the 1920s, Bell worked for Edward Peter Pierce, justice of the Massachusetts Supreme Judicial Court, as well as for the sculptor Gaston Lachaise and his wife, Isabel. During this time, Bell would spend her evenings in her room, drawing simple images, many of women. Isabel Lachaise described these drawings as "miracles" and recommended them to Bell's later patron Carl Van Vechten.

Artistic career 
In the mid-1930s, Bell left regular employment to focus on her artwork. She created over 150 known works between 1936 and 1939. Bell primarily worked in crayon and colored pencil on the type of tissue paper used in dressmaking. Her drawings were elegant scenes from the everyday life of the rich white women, as well as Creole or African-American subjects. Her subjects were often strong, powerful women, though if the subjects were of mixed race her drawings maintained the social structure of the time, with the white subjects drawn in better clothing or otherwise more prominently.

Her artwork became known to the general public thanks to patrons such as author Gertrude Stein, writer and photographer Carl Van Vechten, publicist Mark Lutz, critic Henry McBride and artist Florine Stettheimer. Van Vechten alone commissioned roughly 100 drawings from Bell. Van Vechten included over 100 of her drawings in a donation works by black artists to Yale's Yale's Beinecke Library. The first public showing of her work occurred years after her death in the 1980s when two Yale graduate students, Mary Kordak and Theresa Leininger, ran across the drawings during a University-wide survey of American drawings.

Death 
Troubled by mental illness, possibly schizophrenia, Bell was admitted to Boston State Hospital in 1940. She died in the hospital the following year from heart failure.

Selected works
The Lost Chord
Oh, What Lovely Apples
Gratitude
Proposing
American Mixtures of the Ethiopian Race
Admiring the Birds
Princess of the Forest
Fear not, I am with you always
Gentleness/Love in a Garden
Delicate little mother putting the darlings to bed
Piety
The jungle Belle Africa
Meet me in the shadows
Unhappy
Thinking it over
The black beauty dancing girl
East and West--Love at a distance
The young mother
The hunter's delight
New Orleans. Octoroon beauty and her lover
Seeing her lover in a vision, and thinking she may never see him again; it's breaking her little heart
Through kingdoms and palaces we may roam, be it ever so humble, there is no place like home sweet home
Beautiful Miss Paris
Dancing in the lawn. A Lawn Party. Chocolate Cream.
Lawdie, that gal done gone crazy
Love's golden dream: Pleading
Admiration of Ethiopian the immortal
The setting sun
Admiring each other's hair on the lawn
This life is a puzzle
The colored saint
untitled (Spanish dancer?)
Burlesque show on the stage
Courtship is the finest ship that ever saled
Sleeping

References

External links 
Theresa Leininger-Miller,  "Bell, Mary A.", American National Biography Online (2000)
Beineke Rare Book and Manuscript Library, Yale University (contains drawings from 1936 to 1939)

American illustrators
1873 births
1941 deaths
African-American women artists
American women illustrators
20th-century American artists
20th-century American women artists
20th-century African-American women
20th-century African-American people
20th-century African-American artists
Boston State Hospital patients